The David di Donatello Award for Best Actor (Italian: David di Donatello per il miglior attore protagonista) is a film award presented annually by the Accademia del Cinema Italiano (ACI, Academy of Italian Cinema) to recognize the outstanding performance in a leading role of a male actor in an Italian film released during the year preceding the ceremony. The award was first given in 1956, and became competitive in 1981.

Vittorio Gassman and Alberto Sordi are the record holders in this category with seven awards each, followed by Marcello Mastroianni with five.

Nominees and winners are selected via runoff voting by all the members of the Accademia.

Winners and nominees
Below, winners are listed first in the colored row, followed by other nominees.

1950s

1960s

1970s

1980s

1990s

2000s

2010s

Multiple wins and nominations

The following individuals have won multiple Best Actor awards:

The following directors have received three or more Best Actor nominations (* indicates no wins):

See also 
 Nastro d'Argento for Best Actor
 Cinema of Italy

References

External links
 
 Daviddidonatello.it (official website)

David di Donatello
Film awards for lead actor